XHBR-TDT is a television station in Nuevo Laredo, Tamaulipas, Mexico. The station carries Televisa's local programming in Nuevo Laredo.

History
XHBR received its concession on March 18, 1968 and came to air that October, broadcasting on analog channel 11. It was owned by Ramona Esparza González for 20 years until she transferred the station to Televisa subsidiary Televisión de Lerma, S.A., on July 19, 1988. Esparza González had bought XEFE-TV two years earlier. Televisa raised XHBR's effective radiated power from 3.5 to 325 kilowatts. In 2001, Televisión de Lerma was merged into Televimex, and in 2018 the concession was reassigned to Televisora de Occidente amid a major reorganization of concessions that saw them organized by service.

By the 2000s, XHBR was the local outlet of the Canal de las Estrellas network, a role now held by sister XHLAR-TDT. It was among the first stations in Mexico to broadcast in digital television.

Digital services
XHBR carries two subchannels:

References

External links

Television channels and stations established in 1968
HBR-TDT
Spanish-language television stations in Mexico